Alexandru Sahia (pen name of Alexandru Stănescu; October 11, 1908 – August 12, 1937) was a Romanian journalist and short story writer.

Biography
Born in Mânăstirea, Călărași County, as the son of a small landowner, he was enrolled in the Craiova Military College, which he deemed "oppressive". In 1926, he published his first story in the journal  (The Falcons). The following year, he concluded that he was not suited for a military career, and left the college. He finished his secondary education in the Saint Sava National College, then started law studies at the University of Bucharest.

Dissatisfied with life at the University, he became a novice in the Cernica Monastery in 1929. He apparently failed to find what he was looking for, and left after only a year to visit the Holy Land. While there, he decided to adopt the name "Sahia", which is Arabic for "truth".

In 1932, he helped create the proletarian literary journal, but it suffered from censorship and low readership.

Still in search of something to give meaning to his life, he visited the Soviet Union in 1935. He was impressed with what he saw and, upon his return, wrote USSR Today, in praise of their accomplishments. The following year, he joined the Romanian Communist Party (RCP).

In 1937, he died in Bucharest of untreated tuberculosis. In 1946, after the Communist takeover, he was promoted as a hero of the working class and the manner of his death enabled the RCP to portray him as being the son of "poor peasants".

Several of his works have been made into films. In December 1952, the Romanian state company Romfilm was renamed the "Alexandru Sahia Film Studio"; in July 1991 the studio was reorganized as Sahia-Film.

References

External links

 (Mentions the hypocrisy of Sahia's myth being encouraged by the Party.)

1908 births
1937 deaths
People from Călărași County
Saint Sava National College alumni
Romanian communists
20th-century journalists
Romanian journalists
Romanian male short story writers
Romanian short story writers
Romanian travel writers
Members of the Romanian Academy elected posthumously
20th-century deaths from tuberculosis
Tuberculosis deaths in Romania